Rickettsia heilongjiangensis is a species of gram negative Alphaproteobacteria, within the spotted fever group, being carried by ticks. It is pathogenic (causing rickettsiosis).

References

Further reading

External links
 

Zoonoses
Rickettsiaceae
Bacteria described in 2003